Lenox is a neighborhood in Memphis, Tennessee. It is bounded by Central Avenue in the south, Union Avenue in the north, Cooper Street in the west and East Parkway South in the east.

Prior to 1909, when it was annexed by the City of Memphis, Lenox was its own incorporated municipality. Perhaps one of the most architecturally-significant landmarks in Lenox is Lenox School, which was an elementary school before being converted into condominiums in 1981.

References

Neighborhoods in Memphis, Tennessee
1909 disestablishments in Tennessee
Former municipalities in Tennessee